The Continental Basketball League (CBL), formerly the African Basketball League (ABL), was a men's private professional basketball league in Africa established with the vision of creating opportunities in the sports industry by capturing the rich entertainment culture of Africans to promote sports tourism.

The objectives of the league are to create wealth and employment; develop intra-Africa tourism and integration; and foster internal growth and development. This will be achieved through the development of an ecosystem that will support the creation of viable and valuable basketball franchises.

In May 2016, Abidjan Ramblers defeated Lagos Warriors to become the inaugural winners of the league.

History 
The ABL was launched on Wednesday December 16, 2015 at the Lagos Boat Club, Ikoyi Lagos. The official presentation of the league was made at the launch including the unveiling of the participating clubs, the introduction of the Management Board and the announcement of the league partners. The inaugural season began on Friday March 4, 2016.

The league was intended to run simultaneously with other national leagues in Africa, with the CEO, Ugo Udeze stating that approval was gotten from FIBA Africa before commencement of the league. In March 2016, Nigeria Basketball Federation declared it illegal and expelled two Lagos teams, who previously played in the Nigerian Premier League from returning to the legitimate Nigerian basketball league. FIBA Africa also corroborated the stance by the Nigerian body, explaining that it never gave such approval for the league. 

In 2017, the league re-branded to become the Continental Basketball League (CBL), also named the CBL Africa.

Teams

2017 season 

CBL Teams that are owned by the Continental Basketball League itself.* Teams that are founding members of the ABL in 2016.

Former teams

2016 season 
On May 2016, the Abidjan Ramblers won the inaugural title after beating Stallions in the finals. Jourdain Allou was named Finals MVP.

2017 season 
The regular season began on May 12 and ended May 28, 2017. The final four was played in Lagos on June 3 and June 4, 2017. On June 4, the Lagos City Stars won the second league title and Jordan Mayes was named MVP.

Regular season

Final Four

References

External links 
Official League Page

 
2015 establishments in Africa
Sports leagues established in 2015
Defunct organizations based in Lagos
2017 disestablishments in Africa